The JM cloche is an element of the Maginot Line. It is a non-retractable non-rotating cupola of steel alloy like GFM cloches, but are armed with twin heavy machine guns, as opposed to the lighter automatic rifles associated with the GFM. There are 179 JM cloches on the Maginot Line.

JM is an acronym for Jumelage de Mitrailleuses (twin machine guns).

Description

The JM cloche closely resembles the GFM cloche in size and construction. It exists in three versions, all designed Model 1930: small, large and two-man.  JM cloches had a single firing port, which was flanked on either side by trapezoidal observation ports.  The blank rear was frequently backed by a concrete-covered embankment, which provided additional cover and reduced the prominence of the cloche.

AM cloche
The AM (Armes Mixte) cloche, Model 1934, could mount a 25mm anti-tank gun and paired machine guns in two separate ports. It lacked the JM's observation ports. Shutters could be put in place to close unused ports. The AM existed in both a large and a small version. 72 AM cloches were installed solely in the New Fronts fortifications.

AM conversions
Ten JM cloches were modified to accept a shortened 25mm anti-tank gun in place of the twin machine guns. The modifications took place in 1940 in several ouvrages of the northeast.

See also
LG cloche, grenade launcher cloche
VDP cloche, observation cloche

References

Bibliography 
Mary, Jean-Yves; Hohnadel, Alain; Sicard, Jacques. Hommes et Ouvrages de la Ligne Maginot, Tome 2. Paris, Histoire & Collections, 2001.

External links 
 The Maginot Line

Armoured cloche of the Maginot Line